= International Chinese Academy Education Foundation =

Established in 2015, the International Chinese Academy Education Foundation (ICAEF)’s projects include building and operating schools and institutions inspired by Oxbridge and Chinese academics (書院), scholastic think-tanks, as well as conducting academic research.

== Academic Pursuits ==
ICAEF works with its Strategic Development Manager, i.e. on educational research, institutional establishment, development and management. ICAEF also aims to bring positive social changes to society by leading local and international projects to facilitate global cultural exchanges by partnering with international institutions, such as Oxford University’s departments and colleges and the Confucius Hall of Hong Kong, in developing new schools, such as Chinese Academy (School Registration is still in progress). ICAEF has commenced significant annual donations to establish scholarships at these related education institutions.

It was announced in 2017 that the ICAEF would be establishing a new primary school in Hong Kong, known as Chinese Academy Primary School (CAPS) (School Registration is still in progress).
